Miguel Antonio González (born December 3, 1990) is a Venezuelan former professional baseball catcher. He has played for the Chicago White Sox of Major League Baseball (MLB).

Career

Chicago White Sox
González was called up to the majors for the first time on September 2, 2013. On September 11, 2013, González got his first Major League hit against Cleveland Indians pitcher Josh Tomlin. He was outrighted off the White Sox roster on September 30, 2013.

During the 2015 season, González split time between the Double-A Erie SeaWolves and Triple-A Toledo Mud Hens, appearing in 69 games and hitting .242 with 18 doubles, two home runs and 26 RBIs.

Detroit Tigers
On December 11, 2015, González signed a minor-league contract with the Detroit Tigers, and was invited to spring training. He elected free agency on November 6, 2017.

See also
 List of Major League Baseball players from Venezuela

References

External links

1990 births
Living people
Birmingham Barons players
Bristol White Sox players
Charlotte Knights players
Chicago White Sox players
Dominican Summer League White Sox players
Venezuelan expatriate baseball players in the Dominican Republic
Erie SeaWolves players
Kannapolis Intimidators players
Major League Baseball players from Venezuela
Tiburones de La Guaira players
Toledo Mud Hens players
Venezuelan expatriate baseball players in the United States
Winston-Salem Dash players
People from Nueva Esparta